Yang Shang-hsuan (born November 28, 1983) is a Taiwanese former swimmer, who specialized in breaststroke events. Yang competed only in the men's 100 m breaststroke, as a 16-year-old, at the 2000 Summer Olympics in Sydney. He achieved a FINA B-standard entry time of 1:04.16 from the National University Games in Taipei. He challenged seven other swimmers in heat five, including Israel's top favorite Tal Stricker. He raced to fourth place by more than half a second (0.50) behind winner Stricker in 1:04.54. Yang failed to advance into the semifinals, as he placed fortieth overall on the first day of prelims.

References

1983 births
Living people
Taiwanese male swimmers
Olympic swimmers of Taiwan
Swimmers at the 2000 Summer Olympics
Taiwanese male breaststroke swimmers
Sportspeople from Taipei
Swimmers at the 2002 Asian Games
Asian Games competitors for Chinese Taipei